A Dog's Life is a 1918 American short silent film written, produced and directed by Charlie Chaplin. This was Chaplin's first film for First National Films.

Chaplin plays opposite an animal as "co-star". "Scraps" (the dog) was the hero in this film, as he helps Charlie and Edna towards a better life. Edna Purviance plays a dance hall singer and Charlie Chaplin, The Tramp. Sydney Chaplin (Chaplin's brother) had a small role in this film; this was the first time the two brothers were on screen together.

Charles Lapworth, a former newspaper editor who had met Chaplin when he interviewed him, took a role as a consultant on the film.

Synopsis
Charlie is jobless and has few prospects for employment. He tries to steal food from a lunch cart and is nearly caught by a police officer, avoiding arrest by doing some fancy rolling back and forth under a fence. Later, Charlie saves a stray dog (Scraps) from other dogs. Charlie and Scraps become fast friends and partners in purloining food. Charlie enters a cabaret where dogs are not allowed. Charlie hides Scraps in his baggy trousers, but Scraps' tail emerges from the back end. Charlie meets a girl who works in the cabaret. She is disillusioned with life, so Charlie attempts to cheer her up. Charlie is ejected from the cabaret for having no money and returns to his normal outdoor sleeping spot. By chance, thieves have buried a stolen wallet nearby that is laden with a small fortune. Scraps digs up the wallet. Charlie returns to the cafe and shows the girl he has enough money for them to be married. The crooks discover that Charlie has the wallet and violently take it back from him. Charlie fights furiously to reclaim it. This leads to a frantic chase which culminates in the thieves' arrest. Charlie uses the money to buy a farm for himself and his bride. The movie ends with the newlyweds peering fondly into a cradle. It contains Scraps and her puppies.

Cast
 Charlie Chaplin – The Tramp
 Edna Purviance – Bar singer
 Mut – Scraps, a thoroughbred mongrel
 Syd Chaplin – Lunchwagon owner
 Henry Bergman – Fat unemployed man / Dance-hall lady
 Charles Reisner – Employment agency clerk / Door-to-door / Drummer
 Albert Austin – Thief
 Granville Redmond — Dance-hall owner
 Bud Jamison – Thief
 Tom Wilson – Policeman
 James T. Kelley — Sausage buyer / Robbed passer
 M. J. McCarthy – Unemployed man
 Mel Brown – Unemployed man
 Charles Force – Unemployed man
 Bert Appling – Unemployed man
 Thomas Riley – Unemployed man
 Slim Cole – Unemployed man
 Ted Edwards – Unemployed man
 Louis Fitzroy – Unemployed man
 Loyal Underwood — Unemployed man / Dance-hall man

Stills

References

External links

 
 
 alternate lobby poster
 

1918 films
Silent American comedy films
1918 comedy films
American silent feature films
Short films directed by Charlie Chaplin
American black-and-white films
First National Pictures films
Articles containing video clips
1918 short films
American comedy short films
1910s American films